The following is a list of University of Galway people, including notable alumni and faculty members of the University of Galway and its forerunners: Queen's College, Galway (QCG) created in 1845 as a college of the Queen's University of Ireland; University College, Galway (UCG) chartered in accordance with the Irish Universities Act, 1908 as a university college of the National University of Ireland; and National University of Ireland, Galway (NUI, Galway and later NUI Galway without the comma), a constituent university of the National University of Ireland and newly named since the Universities Act, 1997 until 2022.

Alumni

Politicians
 Michael D. Higgins - 9th President of Ireland
 Enda Kenny
 Eamon Gilmore
 Frank Fahy
 Joseph Brennan
 Séamus Kirk
 Michael Kitt
 Pat "the Cope" Gallagher
 Heather Humphreys
 Michael Ring
 Lisa Chambers
 Barry Cowen
 Anne Rabbitte
 Sylvester Barrett
 Mark Clinton
 Paul Connaughton Jnr
 Ciara Conway
 Rose Conway-Walsh
 Brendan Griffin
 Fidelma Healy Eames
 Jim Higgins
 Lorraine Higgins
 Seán Kyne
 Patrick Lindsay
 Farrell McElgunn
 Bobby Molloy
 Rónán Mullen
 Ronan Moore
 Carol Nolan
 Derek Nolan
 Maureen O'Carroll
 Pádraig Ó Céidigh
 Trevor Ó Clochartaigh
 John O'Mahony
 Pat Rabbitte
 Seán Sherlock
 Madeleine Taylor-Quinn
 Mary Upton
 Pat Upton
 John Dallat - SDLP politician
 Aisling Dolan

Government officials
 Henry Arthur Blake - Governor of Hong Kong (1898-1903)
 Antony MacDonnell, 1st Baron MacDonnell - Colonial Administrator
 Charles James O'Donnell - Colonial Administrator
 John Sheehy - Colonial Official
 William Alfred Browne - Civil servant

Diplomats
 Noel Dorr
 Pádraig MacKernan

Law
 John Atkinson
 Joseph R. Fisher
Mark Heslin, judge of the High Court
 Likando Kalaluka - Attorney General of Zambia in 2015
 Walter Lewis
 Robert McCall
 John Monroe
 Thomas O'Shaughnessy
 Andrew Reed
 Guy Rutledge
 Mathilda Twomey - Chief Justice of the Supreme Court of Seychelles
 Raymond West - High Court Judge in British India
 Máire Whelan - Attorney General of Ireland, Judge of the Court of Appeal

Military
 Major General Michael Beary - UNIFIL Commander
 General Bindon Blood - British military commander
 Major General Kieran Brennan - Deputy Chief of Staff (Ops) and former Kilkenny hurler
 Lieutenant General Sean McCann - Former Chief of Staff of the Defence Forces
 Vice Admiral Mark Mellett - Chief of Staff of the Defence Forces
 Brigadier General Maureen O'Brien - First woman to attain the rank of Lt Colonel (Army Line), Colonel and Brig Gen in the Irish Defence Forces
 Commandant Cathal Berry - Former Deputy Commander of the Army Ranger Wing and Head of the Military Medical School

Religion
 Samuel Angus - Theologian
 Brendan Kelly - Bishop
 Fintan Monahan - Bishop
 Robert Moore - Theologian
 Michael Lenihan O.F.M. - Bishop of La Ceiba, Honduras (2011-present)
 William Mahony S.M.A. - Bishop of Ilorin, Nigeria
 Wilfrid Napier O.F.M. - Cardinal, Archbishop of Durban
 William Slattery O.F.M. - Archbishop of Pretoria
 George Thomas Stokes - Clergyman of the Church of Ireland and Historian

Literature
 Emily Anderson- Linguist
 Gerald Dawe - Poet
 James Hardiman - Librarian
 Mike McCormack - Writer
 Eamonn McGrath- Writer
 Ronan Moore - Writer
 W. F. Marshall - Poet
 Ailbhe Ní Ghearbhuigh - Poet
 Breandán Ó hEithir - Writer
 Valentine O'Hara

Academics
 William Bindon Blood - first Professor of civil engineering at Queen's College Galway
 Alexander Anderson (physicist) - Physicist; former President of Queen's College and University College Galway
 J. E. Cairnes - Economist
 Louis Cullen - Professor of Irish History at Trinity College
 Edward Divers - Chemist
 Charles Joseph Gahan - Coleopterist
 John Hegarty - Provost of Trinity College Dublin
 Máire Herbert MRIA – Professor of Early and Medieval Irish at University College Cork
 Alfred Keogh - Director General Army Medical Services (1905-1910 and 1914-1918)
 Thomas J. Laffey - Mathematician known for his contributions to group theory and matrix theory.
 John A. McClelland - Physicist
 Mick Molloy - IRB Medical Officer
 Michael O'Shaughnessy - Chief Engineer of San Francisco
 Alice Perry - First woman in Ireland to graduate with a degree in engineering

Media
 Patsy McGarry - Journalist
 Harry McGee - Journalist
 T. P. O'Connor
 Frank Hugh O'Donnell
 Conor Pope - Journalist
 Cillian Fennell - Former Head of Programming at TG4 and producer 
 Pat McGrath - Correspondent
 Colm Murray - Sports-reader
 Siún Nic Gearailt - Television newsreader
 Eimear Ní Chonaola - Journalist and television news anchor
 Sean O'Rourke - Presenter
 Gráinne Seoige - Television news anchor

Arts
 Keith Barry -  Performing artist
 Seán McGinley - Actor
 Nora-Jane Noone - Actress
 Martin Sheen - Actor
 Éabha McMahon - Singer
 Leo Moran - Guitarist
 John Coll - Figurative sculptor
 Pádraic Breathnach - Actor; First manager of Galway Arts Centre, Co-founder of Macnas
 John Concannon - Director of Ireland 2016 (official commemorations of the centenary of the Easter Rising)
 Garry Hynes - Co-founder Druid Theatre Company
 Ollie Jennings - Founder of the Galway Arts Festival Co-founder of Macnas;
 Mick Lally - Co-founder Druid Theatre Company
 Marie Mullen - Co-founder Druid Theatre Company
 Nicola Coughlan - Actress

Sports
 Enda Colleran - Gaelic football
 Iarfhlaith Davoren - Association football
 Daithí Burke - Hurling
 Niall Burke - Hurling
 Conor Cleary - Hurling
 Joe Connolly - Hurling
 Joseph Cooney - Hurling
 Anthony Cunningham - Hurling
 Cyril Farrell - Hurling
 Pat Fleury - Hurling
 Francis Forde - Hurling
 John Hanbury - Hurling
 Aidan Harte - Hurling
 Conor Hayes - Hurling
 Seán Loftus - Hurling
 Jeffrey Lynskey - Hurling
 Joe McDonagh - Dual player, Gaelic games administrator and 32nd President of the Gaelic Athletic Association
 Cathal Mannion - Hurling
 Pádraic Mannion - Hurling
 Conor Whelan - Hurling
 Cian Lynch - Hurling
 Eoghan Clifford - Paralympic cyclist
 Cormac Folan - Rower
 Paul Hession - Sprinter
 Olive Loughnane - Racewalker 
 Neville Maxwell - Rower
 Ciaran Fitzgerald - Rugby union

Business
 Nicky Hartery - Chairman of CRH plc
 Declan Kelly - Founding partner and co-CEO of Teneo
 Pádraig Ó Céidigh - Airline developer

Finance and banking
 John Hourican - Investment banker; former CEO of Bank of Cyprus
 Seamus McCarthy - Comptroller and Auditor General

Faculty
 Professor Alan Ahearne - economist working with the International Monetary Fund (IMF)
 John Breslin - engineering professor and entrepreneur
 Nicholas Canny - historian and noted authority on early modern Ireland and Britain
 Ada English - psychiatrist
 Gerard Jennings - physics professor
 Thomas Kilroy - playwright, novelist, former Professor of English at the university
 William King – geologist
 Joseph Larmor - physicist, Professor at Queen's College Galway 1880-1885 and later Lucasian Professor of Mathematics at Cambridge
 Alexander Gordon Melville - Comparative anatomist, Professor at Queen's College Galway 1849-1882
 Derek O'Keeffe - Clinical Fellow, selected as Flight Surgeon for Telemedicine for NASA's NEEMO 21: July 21 - August 5, 2016
 George Johnstone Stoney - physicist who introduced the term electron as the "fundamental unit quantity of electricity"; first Professor of Science at the then new university; elder brother of Bindon Blood Stoney
  D'Arcy Wentworth Thompson - Professor of Greek at UCG from 1862 and father of biologist  Sir D'Arcy Wentworth Thompson 
 Professor Mike Williams - Department of Earth and Ocean Sciences, who between the 2004 Indian Ocean earthquake and tsunami and his death in 2015 became known for his warnings that it was possible for a tsunami to strike Ireland

References

National University of Ireland
Galway
+